State Highway 157 (SH 157) is a  state highway in Boulder, Colorado. SH 157 is also known as Foothills Parkway in Boulder's city street naming system. SH 157's southern terminus is at U.S. Route 36 (US 36) in Boulder, and the northern terminus is at SH 119 in Boulder.

Route description
The road begins in the south at a junction with US 36, the Denver-Boulder Turnpike.  It travels northward through the city of Boulder, crossing SH 7 (Arapahoe Avenue) before connecting to its northern terminus at SH 119. 

Between fall 2019 and fall 2020, the City of Boulder replaced the outdated and deteriorating bicycle and pedestrian overpass just south of Colorado Ave. with an ADA-compliant underpass.

Major intersections

References

External links

157
Transportation in Boulder County, Colorado
Boulder, Colorado